Gabino Rodríguez Rodríguez (born 18 June 1964), known simply as Gabino, is a Spanish former footballer who played as an attacking midfielder.

Club career
Gabino was born in Seville, Andalusia. During his career he played ten seasons as a professional, mainly with hometown club Real Betis and Barcelona-based RCD Español, six of those in La Liga. After three years with the Catalans, he returned to the Estadio Benito Villamarín in 1991 and spent a further two years there, both in the Segunda División, scoring six goals in each one of the campaigns, which did not end in promotion however.

Gabino finished his career after a brief spell with Xerez CD (he also represented CD Logroñés in the second tier early in his career, loaned by Betis) with 161 matches in the top flight, scoring 19 times. After serious economic and personal problems – he was briefly a maintenance worker (kits, balls, etc.) with lowly AD Ceuta, as well as being their assistant manager – he finished his bachelor's degree whilst working in a laundry, and eventually received his coaching licence; his first job was with amateurs CD Quintanar del Rey.

After a few years working as director of football with Ceuta, Gabino once again returned to Betis, as a youth coordinator.

Personal life
Gabino's son, Álvaro Brachi, was also a footballer. He too represented Betis (only the reserves), and spent most of his career with Videoton FC in Hungary.

Honours
Spain
UEFA European Under-21 Championship: 1986

References

External links

1964 births
Living people
Spanish footballers
Footballers from Seville
Association football midfielders
La Liga players
Segunda División players
Segunda División B players
Tercera División players
Betis Deportivo Balompié footballers
Real Betis players
CD Logroñés footballers
RCD Espanyol footballers
Xerez CD footballers
Spain under-21 international footballers
Spanish football managers